Fontaine Weyman, better known as Fontaine, and more recently “Saint Joan”, is a singer, songwriter, who spent the better part of eighteen years writing and recording in Los Angeles, California. She now resides in Charleston, South Carolina.  Born May 7, 1979, in a small village in France, she was raised in South Carolina. In 2006, she self-released her debut album, The Chemistry Between Us.  The track "Long Way Home" is featured in the film All In, starring Michael Madsen, Dominique Swain and Louis Gosset Jr. The track "Running on Empty" was used in a scene of the Fx network television show Justified (Season 5, episode 3). In 2009, she released a follow-up album, Beautiful Thing..

Years later, Fontaine worked with friend and producer, Joseph Holiday, the other half of their electronica side project, “Ex Lions”. Their song “Hail Mary” was featured in an episode of True Blood (Season 6, episode 5) and also appeared in an episode of Agents of S.H.I.E.L.D., while “Secret” was heard in an episode of Graceland (Season 2, Episode 7). A remix of “Secret” was originally set to be the theme song on the later unreleased, Amazon show, Casanova.

On September 18, 2020, Fontaine released her long-overdue third album after a decade-long battle with late-stage Lyme disease and babesiosis. Her latest album is titled Ashes, and for both personal and legal reasons, she released the album under the artist name, “Saint Joan”. This is in reference to Joan of Arc.

On February 25, 2022, her song “Still” appeared in Season 2, Episode 10 of the popular Netflix show, Love is Blind.

She signed an exclusive sync and licensing deal, as “Saint Joan”, with BMG Records in Los Angeles in early 2021.

External links and references
 Myspace page for Fontaine
 CD baby Reviews of the Chemistry Between Us 5, episode 3

1979 births
Living people
American women singer-songwriters
21st-century American singers
21st-century American women singers